{{DISPLAYTITLE:C24H23NO}}
The molecular formula C24H23NO (molar mass: 341.44 g/mol, exact mass: 341.1780 u) may refer to:

 JWH-018, also known as 1-pentyl-3-(1-naphthoyl)indole or AM-678
 JWH-148

Molecular formulas